Takahue is a rural community in the Far North District and Northland Region of New Zealand's North Island, south of Kaitaia.

The local Takahue Marae is a meeting place of the Ngāti Kahu hapū of Te Tahawai. It includes the Ōkakewai meeting house.

Takahue is part of a statistical area called Herekino-Takahue, which extends to the western coast.

Demographics
The SA1 area is part of the larger Herekino-Takahue statistical area.

The SA1 statistical area had a population of 216 at the 2018 New Zealand census, an increase of 18 people (9.1%) since the 2013 census, and an increase of 27 people (14.3%) since the 2006 census. There were 78 households, comprising 111 males and 105 females, giving a sex ratio of 1.06 males per female. The median age was 41.8 years (compared with 37.4 years nationally), with 45 people (20.8%) aged under 15 years, 33 (15.3%) aged 15 to 29, 93 (43.1%) aged 30 to 64, and 42 (19.4%) aged 65 or older.

Ethnicities were 76.4% European/Pākehā, 34.7% Māori, and 1.4% Asian. People may identify with more than one ethnicity.

Of those people who chose to answer the census's question about religious affiliation, 40.3% had no religion, 37.5% were Christian, 2.8% were Buddhist, 1.4% had Māori religious beliefs and 2.8% had other religions.

Of those at least 15 years old, 24 (14.0%) people had a bachelor's or higher degree, and 42 (24.6%) people had no formal qualifications. The median income was $21,600, compared with $31,800 nationally. 15 people (8.8%) earned over $70,000 compared to 17.2% nationally. The employment status of those at least 15 was that 63 (36.8%) people were employed full-time, 30 (17.5%) were part-time, and 12 (7.0%) were unemployed.

Education
Takahue School operated from 1888 to 1973, when it was closed due to falling student numbers.

References

Far North District
Populated places in the Northland Region